The 64th season of the Campeonato Gaúcho kicked off on April 22, 1984 and ended in December 13, 1984. Fourteen teams participated. Internacional won their 29th title. Grêmio Bagé and São Paulo were relegated.

Participating teams

System 
The championship would have three stages.:

 Copa ACEG: All the teams in the championship except Grêmio and Internacional played each other in a double round-robin system. The team with the most points won a direct berth and one bonus point to the Final phase.
 First phase: The fourteen clubs played each other in a double round-robin system. The winners of each round qualified to the Final phase and earned one bonus point. The other remaining berths in the Final phase were filled by the teams with the best season record, with the two best teams from the hinterland earning one bonus point to it as well. The two teams with the fewest points were relegated.
 Final phase: The six remaining teams played each other in a double round-robin system; the team with the most points won the title.

Championship

Copa ACEG

First phase

First round

Second round

Final standings

Final phase

References 

Campeonato Gaúcho seasons
Gaúcho